Madras College, often referred to as Madras, is a Scottish comprehensive secondary school located in St Andrews, Fife. It educates over 1,400 pupils aged between 11 and 18 and was founded in 1833 by the Rev. Dr Andrew Bell.

History
Madras College, founded in 1833, takes its name from the system of education devised by the school's founder, the Rev. Dr Andrew Bell FRSE. However, the origins of the school can be traced to at least the 1490s, through its predecessor institution, the Grammar School of St Andrews.

Bell was born in St Andrews in 1753, the son of a local magistrate and wig-maker. He studied at the University of St Andrews where he distinguished himself in mathematics. He became a clergyman of the Church of England and took up an appointment as chaplain to the regiments of the East India Company in Madras (known since 1996 as Chennai), India. One of his duties was to educate the soldiers' children. Because there was a shortage of teachers, he used the older students, who had been taught the lesson by the master, to instruct groups of younger pupils. The pupils who assisted the teacher were called 'monitors'. This method of education became widely used in schools at home and abroad.

After his return from India, Dr Bell made it his life's work to travel the country and encourage schools to adopt 'the Madras system', as it had come to be known. By the time of his death in 1832, over 10,000 schools were using his methods.

Madras College was founded in 1832 at the bequest and expense of Bell, as the amalgamation of several St Andrews schools. The first amalgamation was in 1833 when the old Grammar School of St Andrews was joined with the "English" school (founded in the 1750s) to form the Madras College. The origin of these names being that the Grammar School was taught mostly in Latin while the "English" school used English only. The Grammar School stood on the grounds between Blackfriars' Church and Lade Braes; the "English" school was on the grounds behind the Church of Holy Trinity, approximately where the town library is today.

The second amalgamation happened in 1963, when Madras College was merged with the Burgh School (founded 1889, based in Abbey Walk). As part of this amalgamation and the introduction of comprehensive education, a new school building was contracted on Kilrymont Road, a mile and a half from the South Street building. The Kilrymont building was constructed in a modernist style, with adjacent playing fields and was opened in 1967.

The school is the only secondary school in Scotland on a split site. The school catchment area takes in a large part of rural north east Fife, and most of the pupils are transported in from the surrounding area by buses.

The badge is a chevron between three bells – a reference to Dr. Bell. The Latin motto is "pro rege et grege" which is customarily translated as "For King and People".

Bell also left money for schools in Inverness (Faraline Park, now Inverness Library), Glasgow, Edinburgh, Leith (Commercial Street) and Cupar (now called Bell Baxter High School, formerly Madras Academy).

In 2021 the school moved into a new building, built at a cost of £50 million.

Staff

Rectors 
From the foundation of Madras College in 1833 until 1888, the school was run by a board of trustees. As part of a series of reforms made at Madras in 1888/89, the position of rector was established. Since 1889 the rectors have been:

 1889–1915 Mr L. St John, MA
 1915–1920 Mr L. J. Gallacher, MA
 1920–1923 Mr R. Holme, MA
 1923–1941 Mr J. D. McPetrie, MA
 1941–1955 Mr N. Macleod, MA 
 1955–1975 Dr John Thompson, MA
 1975–1985 Dr I. D. Gilroy, MA 
 1985–1997 Mr D. D. Galloway, MA 
 1997–2007 Mr L. S. G. Matheson, MA
 2007–2013 Mr I. Jones
 2013–2020 Mr D. McClure, B.Sc.
2020-2021 Mrs A. McNeill
2021–Present Mr K. Currie

Other 

 Charles Lapworth FRS, LLD, FGS (20 September 1842 – 13 March 1920) taught English at Madras. He went on to be the first Professor of Geology at the University of Birmingham. The latter's Lapworth Museum is named in his honour, and holds his archive. He is known for identifying and naming the Ordovician period.

Notable former pupils

 John Maxwell Anderson – surgeon and cancer specialist
 Jamie Allison - At 3ft 3, Allison is officially Scotland’s smallest man.
 Martin Anderson – artist and political cartoonist, better known by his pseudonym Cynicus
 Peter Corsar Anderson – educator and principal of the Scotch College, Perth, Australia
 Sir Robert Balfour – Member of Parliament for Partick
 Beta Band – post-folk band
 James Bridie – Rugby union international who represented Wales
 Ted Brocklebank – journalist, broadcaster and Member of the Scottish Parliament for Mid Scotland and Fife
 Gavin Brown – former Vice-Chancellor of the University of Sydney
 Sir Charles Cameron – physician, newspaper editor and Member of Parliament for Glasgow College and Glasgow Bridgeton
 Bunny Christie – theatre set designer
 Alfred Clunies-Ross – Rugby union international who represented Scotland in the first international rugby match in 1871
 Alex Cole-Hamilton – politician
 Hamish Cowell – British Ambassador to Tunisia
 John Craig – classicist and Firth Professor of Latin at the University of Sheffield
 Learmonth White Dalrymple – New Zealand educationalist
 Rob Dewey – Rugby union international
 Dogs Die In Hot Cars – indie band
 Donald Douglas (surgeon) – surgeon
 Dame Honor Fell – scientist and zoologist
 Olga FitzRoy, audio engineer at Associated Independent Recording and activist
 David Hay Fleming – Scottish historian and antiquarian
 Duncan Forrester – Scottish theologian and the founder of the Centre for Theology and Public Issues at New College, Edinburgh
 Richard Gadd – writer, actor, comedian
 Jenny Gilruth – politician  
 Neil A. R. Gow – professor of Mircobiology
 Sir Edmund Hirst – chemist and Forbes Chair of Organic Chemistry at the University of Edinburgh
 Mike Hulme – Professor of Human Geography at the University of Cambridge
 King Creosote – musician
 Andrew Kirkaldy – racing driver and managing director of McLaren GT 
 Chris Law – Member of Parliament for Dundee West
 George Carmichael Low – parasitologist and founder of the Royal Society of Tropical Medicine and Hygiene
 Andrew Lemoncello – British long distance runner
 Roddy Lumsden – poet
 Doon Mackichan – comedy actress, most notably in Smack the Pony
 John Maclean – musician and film director
 Penny Martin – editor of The Gentlewoman
 Steve Mason – musician and founder of The Beta Band
 Andrew McLellan – Church of Scotland minister, Moderator of the Church of Scotland and Chief Inspector of Prisons for Scotland
 Major Matthew Meiklejohn VC – soldier and recipient of the Victoria Cross 
 Anne Miller – author, QI Elf and radio producer 
 William M'Intosh – physician, marine zoologist and Professor of Natural History at the University of St Andrews
 Old Tom Morris – champion golfer and golf course designer
 Gordon Moulds – Air Commodore who previously held a senior post in the Falkland Islands
 John Munro Bruce – Australian businessman
 Lord Sands – Judge and Member of Parliament for Edinburgh and St Andrews Universities
 Victor Plarr – poet
 Anna Poole, Lady Poole – judge
Eve Poole - author
 Jamie Ritchie – rugby player
 James Robertson - believed to be World's first black rugby union player
 Walter Rutherford – silver medalist in golf at the 1900 Olympic Games in Paris
 Shaun Simpson – British motocross champion
 Christiana Spens – writer and artist
 Alastair Stewart – ITV newsreader
 James Stuart – Member of Parliament for Hackney; Hoxton; and Sunderland and Rector of the University of St Andrews
 Francine Toon – novelist and poet
 KT Tunstall – musician
 Adam Werritty – businessman
 James Yorkston – musician

Bibliography
 Galloway, D. D. (1989). In the Footsteps of Dr Bell. St Andrews: Madras College
 Gilroy, I. D. (1997). The Rev Dr Andrew Bell: Founder of Madras College. St Andrews: Madras College
 Lamont-Brown, R. (2006). St Andrews: City by the Northern Sea. Edinburgh: Birlinn
 Southey, R. (1844). The Life of Rev. Andrew Bell: Comprising the History of the Rise and Progress of the System of Mutual Tuition. London: John Murray 
 Stephen, K. (1983). Andrew Bell F.R.S.E. (1753–1832). Edinburgh: University of Edinburgh History of Medicine and Science Unit
 Thompson, J. (1983). The Madras College 1833–1983. Fife: Fife Educational Resource Centre

References

External links
The Madras College homepage
An article on Andrew Bell and the Madras System
Madras College's page on Scottish Schools Online

Educational institutions established in 1833
School buildings completed in 1833
Category A listed buildings in Fife
Secondary schools in Fife
Education in St Andrews
1833 establishments in Scotland
Listed educational buildings in Scotland